Enka (艶華 -Enka-) is the enka cover album by Japanese singer Akina Nakamori. It was released on 27 June 2007 under the Universal Music Japan. It is Nakamori's fourth cover album.

Background
The album was released in three editions: a cassette tape with A and B side, a limited edition "A", and a limited edition "B".  Edition A includes a DVD disc with film footage of Enka and music video clips from the years 2002–2007.  Edition B includes bonus track in disc 1 with a cover by Teresa Teng and disc 2 includes instrumental versions of the songs arranged by Akira Senju.  The track-list was decided by the results of the inquiry, which fans could vote in the Nakamori's official website.

In 2014, some of the songs from Enka were included in the compilation album All Time Best: Utahime Cover.

Chart performance
Enka debuted at number 10 on the Oricon Album Weekly Chart, charted for 12 weeks and sold over 61,400 copies.

The album has received golden disc from RIAJ and special reward in the 49th Japan Record Awards.

Track listing

First-press edition "B"

References

2007 albums
Japanese-language albums
Akina Nakamori albums
Albums produced by Akina Nakamori
Universal Music Japan albums